The 1975–76 Copa del Generalísimo was the 74th staging of the Spanish Cup. The competition began on 12 October 1975 and concluded on 26 June 1976 with the final.

This was the last season to be called the Copa del Generalísimo, as Francisco Franco died in November 1975. Since then, it has been called the Copa del Rey.

First round

|}

Second round

|}
Bye: Recreativo de Huelva.

Third round

|}

Fourth round

|}
 Bye: CD Tenerife and Real Sociedad.

Round of 16

|}

Quarter-finals

|}

Semi-finals

|}

Final

|}

External links
 rsssf.com
 linguasport.com

Copa del Rey seasons
Copa del Rey
Copa